Basa-Kontagora is an extinct Kainji language of Nigeria. It is spoken in Mariga, Niger State, near Kontagora and the Basa homeland. It is estimated that Basa-Kontagora has less than 10 native speakers as of 2010.

References

Basa languages
Languages of Nigeria
Extinct languages of Africa